Oliver Martin Schneller (born 26 March 1966 in Cologne) is a German composer and saxophonist.

Life
Schneller grew up in Ireland, Sudan, Belgium and the Philippines. After completing a MA in musicology, political science and history at the University of Bonn, he worked for the Goethe Institute in Kathmandu, Nepal (1990–91).

In 1994 he moved to the US, first studying composition at the New England Conservatory in Boston. From 2000–01 he lived in Paris attending a yearlong course at IRCAM/Centre Pompidou. In 2002 he received his doctoral degree in composition at Columbia University as a student of Tristan Murail, where he also taught composition and computer music as an assistant to Murail. During his time in New York Schneller developed and managed the Computer Music Studio at the Graduate Center of CUNY and taught harmony and counterpoint at Baruch College]. Master classes with Salvatore Sciarrino, Jonathan Harvey, Brian Ferneyhough, George Benjamin, and Vinko Globokar provided important orientations. From 2002 to 2004 he was compositeur en recherche at IRCAM working on Jardin des fleuves, a work for ensemble and live-electronic.

Schneller's music has been performed at international festivals such as Festival Agora Paris, Musica Strasbourg, Munich Biennale, MaerzMusik Berlin, Wittener Tage für neue Kammermusik, Ultraschall, Wien Modern, IFNM Darmstadt, Tremplins Paris, Les Musiques Marseille, musique action Nancy, Musica nova, Wintermusic Berlin, Karnatic Lab, Alternativa Moscow, the International Computer Music Conference, in Singapore and Göteborg, Musicaaoustica Beijing, Takefu Japan, Indaba, Aspen Music Festival and School, Tanglewood Music Festival, Frankfurt 2000, and the Millenium Stage Series at the Kennedy Center in Washington DC.

He was a visiting composer at the 2001 Festival of Contemporary Music at the University of Cincinnati Conservatory of Music, and a featured composer at Festival Résonances at IRCAM (2002).

His works have been performed by numerous ensembles including Ensemble modern, Ensemble InterContemporain, MusikFabrik, Ictus Ensemble, Avanti!, ensemble recherche, Speculum Musicae, Court Circuit, Ensemble Mosaik, Südwestrundfunk Orchestra, Kammerensemble Neue Musik Berlin, Ensemble Courage, Antares, the Tanglewood Symphony Orchestra, and St. Luke's Chamber Ensemble.

As a saxophonist, he has performed with the George Russell Big Band, the Gustav Mahler Youth Orchestra under Seiji Ozawa, with the Tanglewood Music Center Orchestra as a soloist in Tan Dun's "Red Forecast", as well as with musicians such as Steve Drury, Heather O'Donnell, Jiggs Whigham (Big Band), Bernhard Lang, Ned McGowan, Robin Hayward, Vinko Globokar, and Gert Matthias Wegner.

In 2004 he was the artistic director of the Tracing Migrations Festival in Berlin which led to the foundation of the Tracing Migrations Project, an ongoing documentation and permanently updated data base of contemporary compositions, recordings and newly founded music institutions from the Arab world. In this function he was a co-curator at Berlin's MaerzMusik Festival 2013.

In 2005 he was the curator of the project The Musical Moment at Berlin's House of World Cultures featuring composers Toshio Hosokawa and Helmut Lachenmann. From 2005–06 he was a guest lecturer and mentor in Cairo as part of the Global Interplay project of Musik der Jahrhunderte, Stuttgart. At Berlin University of the Arts he taught the seminar "Psychoacoustics and Acoustics for Composers".

Schneller is the artistic director of the SinusTon Festival for Experimental Music in Magdeburg which he co-founded with Carsten Gerth in 2008. In 2004, together with Jean-Luc Hervé and Thierry Blondeau, he formed the composers collective Biotope. Since 2009 he serves as sound arts curator of ha'atelier Platform for Philosophy and Art and Taswir Projects. His works have been recorded on Wergo, Mode, Hathut, Telos, and LJ Records.

From 2009–2010 Schneller held a professorship in composition at the State University of Music and Performing Arts Stuttgart as a sabbatical replacement for Prof. Marco Stroppa. From 2012–2015 he was a professor of composition at the Hochschule für Musik, Theater und Medien Hannover. In 2015 Schneller was appointed professor of composition and director of the Eastman Computer Music Center at the Eastman School of Music in Rochester. Since 2019 he is professor for composition at the Robert Schumann Hochschule Düsseldorf in Düsseldorf, where he currently resides with his wife, pianist Heather O'Donnell, and daughter.

Awards
 1984 First prize in Instrumental Performance of the Interscholastic Association of Southeast Asian Schools
 1996 Robert Starer Prize
 1998 the Boris Rapoport Award for Composition
 1998 Meet The Composer Grant for Joyce Paraphrases
 1998–2002 Presidential fellowship from Columbia University
 1999 Commissioning Prize of the National Flute Association
 1999 Benjamin Britten Memorial Fellowship, Tanglewood Music Center
 2000 Paul Fromm Award Tanglewood Music Center/Harvard University
 2002 Residency at the Maison-Heinrich-Heine in Paris
 2004–05 Fellowship Bavarian Ministry of Science and Culture, Villa Concordia Bamberg
 2006–07 Rome Prize Fellowship of the German Academy Villa Massimo
 2010 Ernst von Siemens Composers' Prize
 2011 Fellowship Civitella Ranieri Foundation

Selected works

Orchestral
 Gammes, full orchestra, 1995
 Tightrope Dancer, full orchestra, 1996
 Wu Xing/Fire, full orchestra, 2010
 Wu Xing/Metal, full orchestra, 2006–11
 Dreamspace, full orchestra and soloist ensemble, 2011
 "Wu Xing/Water", full orchestra, 2013–14
 Tropes, full orchestra, 2014

Chamber music (1–4 players)
 Big City Divertimento, 4 saxophones, 1995
 Kumoijoshi, soprano saxophone, koto, 1995
 Hoqueterie, alto saxophone, tenor saxophone, guitar, percussion, 1996
 Marsyas, amplified flute, amplified cello, 1996
 Processional Suite, 2 guitars, 1996
 Five Miniatures after Maurice Sendak, French horn, trumpet, trombone, 1998
 Joyce Paraphrases, amplified string quartet, tape, 1998
 Trio, cello, piano, accordion, 1999
 Phantom Islands, (14 players) + electronics, 2000
 Topoi, clarinet, violin, cello, piano, 2000
 Soleil in memoriam Iannis Xenakis, flute, piano, 2001
 Twilight Dialogues, flute, clarinet, viola, percussion, 2005
 String Space, violin, viola, cello + electronics, 2005
 Resonant Space, 2 pianos, 2 percussion, 2007
 per maggior intreccio, flute, harpsichord, 2007
 Rugged Space, accordion, piano + electronics, 2009
 Die unendliche Feinheit des Raumes, organ, horn, tuba, percussion + electronics, 2005
 Vier Szenen, flute, percussion, piano, 2010
 Cyan, for two pianos and two percussions, 2011

Chamber music (5–22 players)
 Finnegain Speaking, 9 players, 1997
 Aqua Vit, 8 players, 1999
 Diastema, 14 players, 2001–02
 Jardin des fleuves, 16 players + electronics, 2002–04
 Clair/Obscur, 7 players + electronics, 2005–06
 Stratigraphie I, 6 players + electronics, 2007
 Musica ficta, 5 players + electronics, 2008
 Paysage sauvage, 4 players + electronics, 2009
 Stratigraphie II, 6 players + electronics, 2009–10
 Kagura, solo flute + 22 players, 2010–11
 Transatlantic Jukebox, piano and chamber orchestra, 2012
 Amber, two string quartets, 2011–12
 Alice Blue, for ensemble, 2014
 Superstructure, for six percussionists, 2014

Vocal
 Rice Pudding (text by A.A. Milne), speaker, piano, 1993
 Three Songs after Hopkins, Shelley and Meredith, soprano, piano, 1994
 Alice Setting (text by Lewis Carroll), soprano, mixed chorus, piano, percussion, string orchestra, 1997
 Pour Schnabelmax. Hommage à Max Ernst (text by the composer), 3 male voices, 1999
 Candidum lilium for vocal ensemble (SSTTB) + electronics, 2005
 Abendlied for voice, clavichord, violin, cello, 2009
 Monodie for voice and electronics, 2010
 Mugen for Noh voice and electronics, 2011
 Kireji for vocal ensemble and loudspeakers, 2015

Solo
 Vier Capricen, piano, 1989–90
 Sieben Bilder, piano, 1995
 Reed-Weed, alto saxophone, 1996
 Labyrinth, piano, 1996
 Aurora, piano, 1997
 Clouds, piano, 1998
 Five Imaginary Spaces, piano + electronics, 2001
 And Tomorrow, piano + electronics, 2004
 Turbulent Space, recorder + electronics, 2005
 Track & Field, piano, video + electronics, 2006–07
 Open Space, organ + electronics, 2011

Electroacoustic + Installation
 Variations on a Word, tape, 1997; Bell/Man, tape, 1998
 Proteus, tape, 1999
 Cell Cycle, for six channel audio + video, 2007
 La couleur du son, 4 channel audio-visual installation, 2005
 WuXing, five channel audio-visual installation, 2007
 Voice Space, six channel interactive audio-visual installation, 2007
 An Atlas of Sounds, 42 Channel audio-visual Installation, 2009–10

Collaborative works
 Trojan Lion, 5.1 Channel interactive sound installation with Peter Wyss, 2010
 Lichtkörper (2009): 4 Channel Sound Installation for suspended speakers with Alexander Polzin, 2009
 IO, 5.1 Channel Installation with Curtis Anderson, 2006
 Cento Correnti (2006) 20.1 Channel Sound Installation with Iris Dupper, 2006
 Ritratto Romano, Soundtrack to a video work of Christoph Brech, 2006
 Duets I–VII (2006–11): Soundtracks to seven video works of Eberli/Mantel, 2006–11
 Imperfect Enjoyment, Soundtrack to a video work of Almut Determeyer, 2004

Arrangements
 Sechs kleine Klavierstücke (Nos. 1, 2, 6), Op. 19 (Arnold Schoenberg), orchestra, 1989
 Zehn Märsche um den Sieg zu verfehlen (Nos. 5, 9) (Mauricio Kagel), orchestra, 1995
 All of Me, full orchestra, 2007
 My Funny Valentine, full orchestra, 2007
 "You're the Top", wind band, 2012

Publications

 "Klänge einer Ausstellung . Anmerkungen zum kontrapunktischen Soundparcours von Taswir", in: TASWIR. Islamische Bildwelten und Moderne, Nicolai Verlag Berlin, 2009, pp. 133–137
 Akustisches Modell und komponierte Struktur, Institut für Neue Musik und Musikerziehung, Darmstadt 2008, Schott Verlag Mainz, 2009, pp. 183–189
 Sechs Werke von Sebastian Stier. Schott Verlag/WERGO Edition Zeitgenössische Musik (Deutscher Musikrat), Booklettext WER 6569 2 (2008)
 "Migration and Identity: Perspectives in Contemporary Arabic Music", Jahrbuch der Berliner Gesellschaft für Neue Musik, Pfau Verlag, 2006, pp. 127–139
 "HörRaum Stadt", Jahrbuch der Berliner Gesellschaft für Neue Musik 2003/2004, Pfau Verlag 2006, pp. 99–100
 "Raumklang-Klangraum: Über Pierre Boulez' Répons", Magazin der Berliner Philharmoniker, October 2005, pp. 38–40
 "Braucht die Neue Musik den Kammermusiksaal?", Bauwelt 8/05 (2005), pp. 26–27
 A Contemporary Response to Charles Ives in: Berliner Festspiele (Hg.), MaerzMusik. Festival für aktuelle Musik 2004, Saarbrücken (Pfau) 2004, pp. 146–153
 Klangschicht und Zeitharmonik. Begegnung mit Gottfried Michael Koenig, program booklet for the 3rd Magdeburg Concerts. Festtage zur Musikgeschichte Magdeburgs, October 2003
 Music und Raum, Research Commission from the House of World Cultures (HKW) Berlin 2003
 "Sonic Arts in Germany", M.I.T. Press, Computer Music Journal 26, 4 (Spring 2002), pp. 54–57
 "Chambres Séparées, KOMA, entrop, Zwischenwelten: Gerhard Winkler", M.I.T. Press, Computer Music Journal 25, 1 (2001): pp. 75–76
 "Material Matters", Current Musicology 67/68 (Winter 2002): pp. 156–174
 "IRCAM at Columbia 1999", Dossier d'Information IRCAM, No. 18 (October 2000), pp. 136–138)
 "Musik und Utopie", Universalmaschine, no. 2, Berlin (2001), pp. 68–70
 Donald Martino's Concerto for Alto Saxophone and Orchestra, CD-liner text New World Records, Recorded Anthology of American Music, No. 80529-2 (1998)

Translations (selection)

 "Helmut Lachenmann – Four Questions Regarding New Music", translated into English for Contemporary Music Review, vol. 23, no. 3/4 (September 2004)
 James Harley: "Sonic and Parametrical Entities in Tetras: An Analytical Approach to the Music of Iannis Xenakis", translated into German for Musiktexte 91 (December 2001)
 Neil Leonard (1994): "Kompromißlos und fortschrittlich. Juan Blanco: Kubas Pionier der Elektroakustischen Musik", translated into German for Musiktexte 96 (May 2003)

References

External links
 
 
 Sound Object and Composed Space by Markus Böggemann (text, English) © Ernst von Siemens Musikstiftung, 2010
 Entretien avec Oliver Schneller by Eric Denut (text, French) © accents. la revue de l'Ensemble Intercontemporain No. 24, 2004
 Klangräume und Irritationen CD-Rezension von Stefan Drees, Klassik.com, 2010
 Faculty page at HMTM Hannover
 Faculty page at the Eastman School of Music
 Entry at ZKM Karlsruhe
 Entry at WERGO

German composers
Musicians from Cologne
1966 births
Living people
Columbia University alumni
Ernst von Siemens Composers' Prize winners
New England Conservatory
Academic staff of the State University of Music and Performing Arts Stuttgart